Afnan Hamimi bin Taib Azamudden is a Malaysian politician. He became the elected Perikatan Nasional MP for Alor Setar in the 2022 general election. Additionally, he became the first Malay to represent the constituency ever since its inception. He was a member of Malaysian Islamic Party (PAS), a component party member of Perikatan Nasional (PN).

Election results

References

See also 
 Members of the Dewan Rakyat, 15th Malaysian Parliament

Living people
Members of the 15th Malaysian Parliament
21st-century Malaysian politicians
Malaysian Islamic Party politicians
Year of birth missing (living people)